Samba Mapangala is a Congolese singer and bandleader who has been based in Kenya for most of his five-decade musical career, most notably there creating and leading Virunga, which has been one of the most popular bands in East Africa for more than 35 years.  

He was born in Matadi in what is now the Democratic Republic of Congo. He moved to Kinshasa, where he finished secondary school, in the early 1970s (or in 1977 according to one source, but that year is contradicted by other information in the same and other sources).  After finishing school he was a member of several 1970s Kinshasa bands: he sang with Super Tukina who recorded his first hit, "Satonge," then he joined Super Bella Bella alongside Jean Bosco and Mongoley, a guitarist formerly of Orchestre Lipua Lipua, and he also played with Bariza and Saka Saka.

Mapangala moved to Uganda in 1975 where he and some other Congolese musicians formed the Les Kinois band. They moved to Nairobi in 1977. He formed a new band, the Orchestra Virunga, in 1981. The band is named after Virunga volcano located in Congo.
 
Orchestra Virunga released their first album, It's Disco Time with Samba Mapangala in 1982. In the early 1990s the group gained some international popularity through album releases like Virunga Volcano and Feet on Fire. 
 
He has continued to record, and is still one of the leading musicians in East Africa. He is now based in the United States . Mapangala began performing with Occidental Brothers Dance Band International in the fall of 2009.

Mapangala is considered one of the golden era of Kenyan Lingala music acts alongside Les Mangelepa, Baba Gaston and Super Mazembe. 

At the 2004 Tanzania Music Awards his album Ujumbe was nominated in the best African Album category.

Discography 

Albums
 It's Disco Time with Samba Mapangala (1982)
 Mabiala (1983)
 Evasion, vol. 2 (1983)
 Malako (1984) [re-release of "Disco Time"]
 Safari (1988) (Kenyan cassette)
 Vunja Mifupa (1989) (CBS Kenya IVA 071, cassette)
 Paris-Nairobi (1990) (European cassette)
 Virunga Volcano 1990 (Earthworks, CD) [re-release of "Malako"/"Disco Time" / plus 2 songs]
 Feet On Fire (1990 or 1991)(Stern's Africa STCD 1036, CD)
 Karibu Kenya (1995) (Sun Music, CD)
 Vunja Mifupa (1997) (Lusam 01, CD)
 Song and Dance (2006"]
 Ujumbe (2001) (Stern's / Earthworks STEW43CD)
 Virunga Roots Volume 1 (2004) (Samba Mapangala)
 Virunga or  Samba Mapangala In Paris (?) [Kenyan cassette, 4 songs from "Virunga Roots Volume 1"]
 Song and Dance (2006) (Virunga Records)
 African Classics: Samba Mapangala & Virunga (2008) (Sheer Sound)
 Live on Tour (2009)
 Maisha Ni Matamu (Life Is Sweet) (2011)

Contributing artist
The Rough Guide to the Music of Kenya and Tanzania (1996) (World Music Network)

External links
Virunga records
African Music Encyclopaedia Entry
African Music Profiles Page

References 

Year of birth missing (living people)
Living people
People from Matadi
Democratic Republic of the Congo emigrants to the United States
Kenyan emigrants to the United States
Democratic Republic of the Congo musicians